King Taejong Muyeol (604–661), born Gim Chunchu, was the 29th ruler of Silla, one of the Three Kingdoms of Korea. He is credited for leading the unification of Korea's Three Kingdoms.

Background
King Taejong Muyeol was born with the "sacred bone" rank of seonggol. His father, Gim Yongsu (金龍樹), was a son of Silla's 25th ruler, King Jinji. When King Jinji was overthrown, all royalty from his line, including Gim Yongsu, were deemed unfit to rule over the kingdom. However, as Yongsu was one of the few remaining seonggols, and married a seonggol princess (King Jinpyeong's daughter Princess Cheonmyeong), their child, Gim Chunchu, became seonggol and thus had a claim to the throne. Gim Yongsu was a powerful figure in the government; however, he lost all of his power to Gim Baekban, the brother of the king. In order to survive, he accepted to become a jingol, the rank that was right below seonggol, therefore removing the right of becoming the king for him and his son, Gim Chunchu. Following the death of his aunt, Queen Seondeok, Chunchu was passed over in favor of Jindeok of Silla, the last verifiable seonggol. With her death, all the seonggols were dead, so somebody with the royal blood in the jinggol rank had to succeed the throne. Alcheon, who then held the title Sangdaedeung, or highest post of government, of Silla was the original favorite to succeed the throne. His father was a seonggol, who married a jingol woman so that his son would not be a seonggol and suffer from the fight for the throne. However, Gim Yu-sin supported Gim Chunchu, and Alcheon eventually refused the throne and supported Chunchu's claim. As a result, Gim Chunchu succeeded the throne as King Muyeol.

Marriage to Gim Yu-sin's sister
Gim Yu-sin had two sisters: Bohee and Munhee. Bohee was a shy girl with a delicate appearance, while Munhee was a tall and outgoing girl. Gim Yu-sin had always hope for one of his sisters to be married to Gim Chunchu.

One day, Gim Chunchu went to Gim Yu-sin's house for a game of Gyeokgu (격구, traditional Korean polo). During the game, Gim Yu-sin deliberately tore off one of the tassels on Gim Chunchu's robe. Gim Yu-sin offered to have it sewn by one of his sisters; he then sent for Bohee to have it mend, but she was too nervous to come into the presence of a stranger, and politely refused by saying that "she cannot do something so small for someone so precious". Munhee stepped out and offered to sew it instead. When they met, Gim Chunchu and Munhee fell in love with each other. Gim Chunchu started to visit Munhee more often, but Gim Yu-sin pretended not to be aware of their relationship. Eventually, Munhee became pregnant, however, Gim Chunchu decided to keep it a secret in fear of causing trouble since he was already a married man. When Gim Yu-sin found out about it, he scolded his sister severely, then ordered their servants to spread the rumor of his sister's pregnancy and that he might kill her because of it in a plan to pressure Gim Chunchu into marrying his sister.

Not long afterwards, Queen Seondeok decided to take a walk with her officials on the Namsan Mountain. When he heard of it, Gim Yu-sin made a pile of dry logs and twigs in the garden outside of his house and set it on fire for the Queen to see. High up on the mountain, the Queen noticed the black smoke that was coming from Yushin's residence area, and asked those accompanying her if they knew the reason. No one dared to answer her, but simply looked at one another in embarrassment. When the Queen pressed on the issue, she finally learned from them about the rumor of Munhee's pregnancy out of wedlock and that Gim Yu-sin might burn her to death because of it. She was astonished with what they said and wondered "Who could the father be, to make Gim Yu-sin act like that". She then noticed the anxious look on Gim Chunchu's face and asked if he knew anything about it. After the truth was revealed, the Queen ordered him to go and save Munhee's life by granting him the permission to marry her as his second wife, to become his lawful spouse when his first wife died.

Munhee officially became his wife after Gim Chunchu's wife (Boryang) died of childbirth with their second child. She became his Queen after he was crowned as the 29th King of Silla on year 654. Their  child grew up to be King Munmu, who completed the unification of The Three Kingdoms of Korea, 29 years after Queen Seondeok's death. Gim Yu-sin became the most powerful man in the court during King Muyeol's reign and eventually became a Sangdaedeung, six years later. His sister Bohee also became one of King Muyeol's wives.

Reign
He was well acquainted with the Emperor Gaozong of the Tang dynasty, for he and the Emperor were friends before Gaozong became an Emperor. King Muyeol was a great support to the Emperor, and the Emperor returned the support to King Muyeol. He constantly pleaded with the Tang for reinforcements to destroy Baekje, to which the Tang finally acquiesced in 660, sending 130,000 troops under General Su Dingfang. Meanwhile, Gim Yu-sin set out from Silla with 50,000 soldiers and fought the bloody Battle of Hwangsanbeol leaving Baekje devastated and unprotected. King Uija of Baekje finally surrendered, leaving only Goguryeo to face Silla as an adversary on the Korean peninsula.

In June of the following year King Muyeol died, leaving his son Gim Beopmin to assume the throne.

Family
Parents
Father: Kim Yong-su (Hanja: 金龍春 or金龍樹, Hangul 김용춘 or 김용수)( 578–647) 
Grandfather: King Jinji of Silla
Grandmother: Lady Jido of the Park clan (Hangul: 지도부인 박씨, Hanja: 知道夫人 朴氏)
Mother: Princess Cheonmyeong (Hangul: 천명공주, Hanja: 天明公主)
Grandfather: King Jinpyeong of Silla
Grandmother: Queen Maya
Consorts and their Respective Issue:
Princess Bora (Hangul: 보라궁주, Hanja: 寶羅宮主)  of the Gyeongju Seol clan (설씨)
Lady Gotaso (627 – 642) (고타소랑, Hanja: 古陀炤娘)
Second daughter
Queen Munmyeong (Hangul: 문명왕후, Hanja: 文明王后) of the Gimhae Kim clan
King Munmu of Silla (626 – 681)
Kim In-mun (Hangul: 김인문, Hanja: 金仁問) (629 – 694)
Lady Jiso (Hangul: 지소부인, Hanja: 智炤夫人)
Kim Bo-hui (Hangul: 김보희, Hanja: 金寶姬), Lady Yeonchang (영창부인) of the Gimhae Kim clan
Kim Gaejimun (Hangul: 김개지문, Hanja: 金皆知文)
Kim Cha-deuk (Hangul: 김차득, Hanja: 金車得)
Kim Ma-deuk (Hangul: 김마득, Hanja: 金馬得)
Princess Yoseok (Hangul: 요석공주, Hanja: 瑤石公主)
Kim In-tae (Hangul: 김인태, Hanja: 金仁泰)
Unknown consorts
Kim Mun-wang (Hangul: 김문왕, Hanja: 金文王) (629 – 665)
Kim No-cha (Hangul: 김노차, Hanja: 金老且)
Kim Ji-gyeong (Hangul: 김지경, Hanja: 金智鏡)
Kim Gae-won (Hangul: 김개원, Hanja: 金愷元)

Ancestry

Popular culture
 Portrayed by Lee Ho-seong in 2003 movie Once Upon a Time in a Battlefield.
Portrayed by Kim Byung-se in the 2006 SBS TV series Yeon Gaesomun.
Portrayed by Yoo Seung-ho  and Jung Yun-seok in the 2009 MBC TV series Queen Seondeok.
 Portrayed by Lee Dong-kyu in the 2011 MBC TV series Gyebaek.
 Portrayed by Choi Soo-jong and Chae Sang-woo in the 2012–2013 KBS1 TV series Dream of the Emperor.
Portrayed by Park Jun-hyuk in the 2017 KBS TV series Chronicles.
Portrayed in the 2021 WEBNOVEL titled QUEEN JINDEOK by author TAIYANG DASHENG
yed in the 2021 WEBNOVEL titled QUEEN JINDEOK by author TAIYANG DASHENG

See also
 History of Korea
 Rulers of Korea
 Bone rank system

References

External links
 Kim Chunchu (in Korean)

Silla rulers
604 births
661 deaths
7th-century Korean monarchs